The Aboriginal Peoples Television Network (APTN, stylized aptn) is a Canadian specialty channel. Established in 1992 and maintained by governmental funding to broadcast in Canada's northern territories, APTN acquired a national broadcast licence in 1999. It airs and produces programs made by, for and about Indigenous peoples in Canada and the United States. Based in Winnipeg, Manitoba, it is the first network by and for North American indigenous peoples.

History

Establishment

In 1980, the Canadian Radio-Television and Telecommunications Commission (CRTC) issued the Therrien Committee Report. In that report, the committee concluded that northern Indigenous peoples had increasing interest in developing their own media services and that the government has a responsibility to ensure support in broadcasting of Indigenous cultures and languages. The committee recommended measures to enable northern native people to use broadcasting to support their languages and cultures.

The Canadian government created the Northern Broadcasting Policy, issued on March 10, 1983. It laid out principles to develop Northern native-produced programming. The policy included support for what was called the Northern Native Broadcast Access Program, a funded program to produce radio and/or television programs in First Peoples' languages to reflect their cultural perspectives.

Soon after the program's creation, problems were recognized in the planned program distribution via satellite. In January 1987, Canadian aboriginal and Northern broadcasters met in Yellowknife, Northwest Territories to form a non-profit consortium to establish a Pan-Northern television distribution service. In 1988, the Canadian government gave the organizers $10 million to establish the network. The application for the new service, initially known as Television Northern Canada (TVNC), was approved by the CRTC in 1991. The network officially launched on over-the-air signals to the Canadian territories and far northern areas of the provinces on January 21, 1992.

National expansion and re-launch
After several years broadcasting in the territories, TVNC began lobbying the CRTC to amend their licence to allow TVNC to be broadcast nationally; they promoted the "uniqueness" and "significance" of a national Aboriginal service. On February 22, 1999, the CRTC granted TVNC a licence for a national broadcast network.

On September 1, 1999, the network also re-branded as the Aboriginal Peoples Television Network (APTN). It was added to all specialty television services across Canada. APTN was the first national public television network for indigenous peoples.

Budget

Distribution
APTN's service consists of six different feeds: two terrestrial feeds, separate national cable feeds for Eastern (Ontario and east), Western Canada (Manitoba and west), Northern Canada, as well as a national HD feed.

The terrestrial feed, the successor to the original TVNC, is available over-the-air in Canada's far northern areas. It consists of flagship station CHTY-TV in Yellowknife, Northwest Territories, semi-satellite CHWT-TV in Whitehorse, Yukon, and numerous low-powered rebroadcasters across the Northwest Territories, Yukon, Nunavut, Alberta, Quebec and Newfoundland and Labrador.

On August 31, 2011, APTN shut down 39 low-power television repeaters across the Northwest Territories and Yukon, representing nearly half of its over-the-air transmitters. Although this discontinuation was conducted on the same day as Canada's over-the-air digital conversion deadline in certain mandatory markets, these over-the-air transmitters were not subject to this deadline. None of the mandatory conversion-to-digital markets were located the Northwest Territories or Yukon.

APTN's 2013 CRTC licence renewal featured zero over-the-air transmitters.

In November 2016, CEO Jean La Rose told the Winnipeg Free Press that APTN was negotiating carriage for a U.S. service. He noted that there was a high level of interest among Native Americans for programming relevant to their communities.

The Eastern Canada cable feed operated as the national feed until the Western Canada feed began service on October 2, 2006.

APTN is licensed as a national network by the CRTC, thus putting it on par with CBC Television, Radio-Canada and TVA. Since APTN's relaunch as a national network in 1999, all Canadian cable and satellite television providers have been required to include it in their basic service. However, many cable companies outside the Arctic place it above channel 60 on their systems, rendering it inaccessible to older cable-ready television sets that do not go above channel 60. The CRTC considered requiring cable companies to move APTN to a lower dial position, but decided in 2005 that it would not do so.

In 2019, the channel launched APTN Lumi, a streaming service distributing APTN programming on the internet and streaming television devices.

Programming
APTN offers a variety of programming related to Aboriginal peoples, including documentaries, news magazines, dramas, entertainment specials, children's series, movies, sports events, educational programs and more. APTN's network programming is c. 56% English, 16% French, and 28% Aboriginal languages.

Programs which have aired on APTN include:

 APTN National News
 APTN Contact
 Arbor Live!
 Bingo and a Movie
 Blackstone
 Bro'Town
 Bordertown
 By The Rapids
 The Candy Show
 Cashing In
 Caution: May Contain Nuts
 Chuck and the First Peoples Kitchen
 Cooking With the Wolfman
 The Deerskins
 Delmer & Marta
 DJ Burnt Bannock
 First Contact
 Finding Our Talk: A Journey Through Aboriginal Languages, the world's first series in Mohawk language, three seasons (2001, 2002, 2009)
 Friday Night Flick
 Fugget About It
 Future History
 Gespe'gewa'gi: The Last Land
 Guides and Gurus
 Guilt Free Zone
 Hard Rock Medical
 Icons
 Medicine Woman
 Mixed Blessings
 Moccasin Flats
 Mohawk Girls
 My TV
 Native New Yorker
 North of 60
 Northern Exposure
 One With Nature
 La piqure
 Queen of the Oil Patch
 Querencia
 Quest Out West: Wild Food
 Rabbit Fall
 Rez Bluez
 Secret History of the Wild West
 The Sharing Circle
 Shortland Street
 Storytellers in Motion
 Tribal
 Warriors: TKO
 Wentworth
 Wild Archaeology
 Yukon Harvest

Children's programming
APTN airs children's programming, primarily as part of the APTN Kids block and branding.

Original programming
 Anaana's Tent
 Anash and the Legacy of the Sun-Rock
 Animism: The Gods' Lake
 Artie the Ant aka The Adventures of Artie the Ant
 Bizou
 CG Kids
 Chic Choc
 Doggy Day School
 The Adventures of Dudley the Dragon (both English and French dubs)
 The Eggs
 Fire Quest
 Fruity Tales
 Guardians Evolution
 Inuk
 Kagagi: The Raven
 La Crosse Goals
 The Link (TV series)
 Little Bear
 Louis Says
 Missy Milly
 Monster Math Squad
 Mouki
 Nehiyawetan
 The New Adventures of Lucky Luke
 Planet Echo
 Qanurli
 The Raccoons
 Raven Tales
 renegadepress.com
 Road Scholars
 Stories of Our Elders
 Takuginai
 Tamanevugut
 Tiga Talk
 Tipi Tales
 The Nature Show
 Total Drama: Pahkitew Island
 Wapos Bay
 Wawatay Kids TV
 Wumpa's World
 Wakanheja
 Yvon of the Yukon

Sports programming
On March 24, 2019, tying in with English-language coverage originating on-location from the Enoch Cree Nation reserve outside of Edmonton, APTN simulcast a Sportsnet-produced NHL game between the Montreal Canadiens and Carolina Hurricanes with commentary in Plains Cree, as part of the Rogers Hometown Hockey package. On December 13, 2019, APTN and Rogers announced that they would broadcast six Hometown Hockey games per-season in the language over the next three years.

High definition 
In March 2008, APTN launched a high definition channel known as APTN HD; initially, the HD feed was a straight simulcast of APTN's Eastern cable feed, complying with the requirement that a specialty channel's HD simulcast must be 95% identical in programming and scheduling to its standard-definition feeds. In May 2017, the CRTC amended APTN's license so that APTN HD's programming would no longer necessarily have to mirror the scheduling of the SD feeds, as long as 95% of its programming had aired at some point on one of APTN's SD feeds. The network argued that this change would allow it more flexibility in scheduling programming on APTN HD to reach a broader audience.

First Peoples Radio
On June 14, 2017, a subsidiary of APTN, First Peoples Radio Inc. (FPR), was granted licences by the CRTC to operate radio stations in Toronto and Ottawa aimed at urban Indigenous populations in those cities. The Ottawa station will broadcast on 95.7 FM and the Toronto station will use 106.5 FM. Both frequencies had previously been allocated to Aboriginal Voices Radio which had its licenses revoked in 2015. FPR had also applied for licenses in Edmonton, Calgary, and Vancouver but the CRTC granted these to other applicants.

First Peoples Radio Inc had originally announced that its two radio stations, CFPT-FM in Toronto and CFPO-FM in Ottawa, were to go on the air by June 2018 but later delayed its soft launch until October 24, 2018. FPR will produce and share programming with the Missinipi Broadcasting Corporation in Saskatchewan and Native Communications Incorporated in Manitoba and is also in talks with the Aboriginal Multi-Media Society, which has been granted radio licenses in Edmonton and Calgary, and Northern Native Broadcasting (Terrace), which operates an Indigenous radio station in Terrace, British Columbia, and has been granted a license to operate a radio station in Vancouver, about potential programming partnerships.

The stations first went on the air on October 24, 2018 at noon, branded as Elmnt FM.

Expansion into the United States 
APTN is working towards launching a similar outlet, tentatively titled All Nations Network, in the United States. The network has already aired works produced in the United States, such as the full-length documentary film Skydancer, directed by Katja Esson, about the community of Akwesasne and its ironworkers. It was aired on both APTN and PBS in the United States in October 2012, after winning awards at film festivals.

See also 

 CBC North
 World Indigenous Television Broadcasters Network
 Aboriginal Canadian personalities

Ownership 
APTN will avoid stereotypes and clichés when they choose advertisers.

References

External links 
 

Companies based in Winnipeg
Television channels and stations established in 1992
First Nations mass media
Indigenous television in Canada
Broadcast television networks in Canada
Inuit culture
Analog cable television networks in Canada
Indigenous film and television production companies in Canada
Indigenous organizations in Manitoba
1992 establishments in Canada